Cellulophaga algicola is a bacterium. It was first isolated from the surfaces of the chain-forming sea-ice diatom Melosira. It is most similar to Cellulophaga baltica. Its type strain is IC166T (= ACAM 630T).

References

Further reading

Ludwig, Wolfgang, Jean Euzéby, and William B. Whitman. "Road map of the phyla Bacteroidetes, Spirochaetes, Tenericutes (Mollicutes), Acidobacteria, Fibrobacteres, Fusobacteria, Dictyoglomi, Gemmatimonadetes, Lentisphaerae, Verrucomicrobia, Chlamydiae, and Planctomycetes." Bergey's Manual® of Systematic Bacteriology. Springer New York, 2010. 1–19.

External links
LPSN
WORMS entry
Type strain of Cellulophaga algicola at BacDive -  the Bacterial Diversity Metadatabase

Flavobacteria
Bacteria described in 2000